August Suter may refer to:
 August Suter (politician)
 August Suter (sculptor)